Furulunds IK is a Swedish football club located in Furulund.

Background
Furulunds IK currently plays in Division 3 Södra Götaland which is the fifth tier of Swedish football. They play their home matches at the Ljungvalla IP in Furulund.

The club is affiliated to Skånes Fotbollförbund. Furulunds IK played in the 2007 Svenska Cupen but lost 1–4 at home to Gantofta IF in the first round with an attendance of 154 spectators.

Season to season

In their most successful period Furulunds IK competed in the following divisions:

In recent seasons Furulunds IK have competed in the following divisions:

Footnotes

External links
 Furulunds IK – Official website
 Furulunds IK on Facebook

Sport in Skåne County
Football clubs in Skåne County
1910 establishments in Sweden